Rafiq Villas,  formerly known as Kujjianwala, is a small town in Kasur, Punjab, Pakistan. It was founded by Peir Muhammad, who is the predecessor of Haji Muhammad Rafiq, credited to him as Rafiq Villas. Peir Muhammad founded this great village about 1000 years ago.

Just before the entrance, there is Pak Cattle Feed factory, a famous company in Pakistan for cattle feed. There are very amazing green scenes which enhances the beauty of this town as shown by the image.

Haji Muhammad Rafiq 

Haji Muhammad Rafiq, the ex-councillor of the village, is the famous landlord of the area. His six sons are named Riaz, Ijaz, Yasir, Asad, Khurram, Saqib. Mr Riaz, Ijaz, Yasir and Khurram are living in this village and have their own agricultural farm house of about 100 acres. They have industrialized this agricultural town by founding a factory. After completing his degree in law, Mr Asad has settled in Manchester, U.K. Saqib is also studying business.

The Dynasty Tree of Peir Muhammad is shown below...

Population 

The population of this town is almost 5,000. There are some traditional groups of families living in this town; namely Peir Muhammad, Jaggay, Kamry kay, Kujji and Masty Kay although some new groups have arisen in the previous 20 or 30 years such as Qazi, Muhammad Hussain, Mahr and others.

Source of Income 

Most people own about less than 10 acres of land and about 90% of income is from agricultural sector. Some famous shops in the area include Mochi di hatti and Kali may di hatti.

Religion 

There are two mosques in this town. The famous one is called Ahl-e-Hadis Sunni and the other is a Barelvi Sunni mosque. The two Islamic religious sects that prevail in this town are Wahabi and Sunni. There are no Shia in this town but there are some Christians. Those Chura Christians who have accepted Islam are called Deendar.

Infrastructural development 

Infrastructural development has been very late in this town. Electricity was installed in 1980 and landline phones in 1998. Mobile industry sprang out in Pakistan in about 2002 but in Rafiq villas, there are great signal problems still. However, amazingly Mr. Khurram has installed a very advanced wifi network in Rafiq Villas which is appreciated by villagers and has made them known of the new technology.

Pak Cattle Feed and Zea Silage Factory

References

Rafiq Villas comes under UC 20 Fatoohi wala. Ch. Yasir Rafiq is the strong candidate for Chairman of the UC in upcoming October 2015 local bodies election. His election campaign is at full swing and very successful in his constituency.

Populated places in Kasur District